Matourea azurea, the Amazon blue, is a species of shrub in the family Plantaginaceae. It is native to Brazil.

References

Plantaginaceae
Flora of Brazil